ESIGETEL (École supérieure d'ingénieurs en informatique et génie des télécommunications) was founded in 1986 by the Melun Chamber of Commerce. Most students joining ESIGETEL follow the traditional path to the Grandes écoles and come from preparatory classes (two years) and graduate in three years.

ESIGETEL is in the vicinity of Villejuif, France and is a member of the Polytechnicum of Marne la Vallée.

Curriculum
ESIGETEL has been focused on teaching new technologies in the fields of telecommunications, networking, information systems, and computer science since its inception.

The three-year curriculum covers six primary domains in the first and second years:

 Computer science 
 Networks
 Mathematics and signal processing
 Electronics
 Economy 
 Languages

and four options in the third year:
 Embedded system
 Software systems and networks
 Mobile & Radio Communications 
 System & Network Administration & Architecture

External links (French)

Official school sites
 Official school website
 Site du gala
 The School's IRC server, member of the GeekNode network

School student sites
 le BDE: bureau des élèves 
 la SCER (la Junior-Entreprise)
 L'association sportive de Lafeymas (bureau des sports)
 Association 4L Clan qui participe au 4L Trophy
 Association voile Sillage
 Club BD/manga
 AAEE (Association des Anciens Elèves de l'ESIGETEL)
 Club Robotique de l'ESIGETEL

Engineering universities and colleges in France
Universities in Île-de-France
Buildings and structures in Val-de-Marne
Grandes écoles
Educational institutions established in 1986
1986 establishments in France
Telecommunication education